Drunk History: El lado borroso de la historia, or simply Drunk History, is a Mexican adaptation of the American television series of the same name, which in turn is based on the web series Funny or Die. The series revolves around a narrator, who with his favorite alcoholic beverage, recounts a historical episode in front of the camera. Each story is interpreted by a group of actors that tries to represent the occurrences of the drunk. The series premiered on 8 February 2016 on Comedy Central Latin America.

Cast

Regular cast 
 Eugenio Derbez as Himself
 Javier Noriega as Various roles

Notable guest stars 
 Alfonso Herrera as Aquiles Serdán / Ernesto "Che" Guevara
 Marco Treviño as Porfirio Díaz 
 Roberto Flores as Fidel Castro
 Bruno Bichir as Cristóbal Colón
 Ana de la Reguera as Amada Diaz
 Luis Gerardo Méndez as Hernán Cortés
 Ana Claudia Talancón as La Güera Rodríguez
 Gerardo Taracena as Nezahualcóyotl
 Roberto Sosa as Agustín Lara
 Jesús Zavala as Joselito
 Liz Gallardo as Frida Kahlo
 Miguel Rodarte as Antonio López de Santa Anna
 Christian Tappan as Flaco
 Alejandro Calva as Miguel Hidalgo
 María del Carmen Félix as María Félix
 Ianis Guerrero as Zapata
 Erick Elías as Ávila Camacho
 Christian Vázquez as Emiliano Zapata
 Sofia Niño de Rivera as Herself
 Erik Hayser as Gonzalo Guerrero
 Viviana Serna as Manuela Sáenz
 Héctor Berzunza as Simón Bolívar
 Irving Dublín as Guard

Episodes

Series overview

Season 1 (2016)

Season 2 (2016)

Season 3 (2017)

References

External links 
 

2016 Mexican television series debuts
2010s Mexican television series
Comedy Central original programming
Spanish-language television shows
Mexican television series based on American television series
2010s American sketch comedy television series
Television series featuring reenactments
Fiction with unreliable narrators